Ridge Hannemann Alkonis is a United States Navy lieutenant who was stationed as a weapons officer aboard the USS Benfold at Yokosuka Naval Base in Japan. He was involved in a fatal car crash in Fujinomiya in May 2021, for which he is currently serving a three-year prison term.

Navy career

Crash and trial
On May 29, 2021, Alkonis was driving his family back from a day trip to Mt. Fuji when he lost consciousness behind the wheel, which caused the car to drift across the oncoming traffic lane and into a restaurant parking lot, crashing into several parked vehicles and pedestrians. A Japanese family of four, an elderly couple along with their daughter and son-in-law, were celebrating the mother's birthday at the restaurant. The 85-year-old mother and the 54-year-old son-in-law died as a result of this crash. 

In August 2021, Stars and Stripes reported on the trial:Alkonis testified Tuesday in Shizuoka District Court that he suffered a bout of altitude sickness that day, a leftover effect of the trip he, his wife and their three children had made up the iconic mountain.

He said two doctors, a general practitioner and a neurologist, had diagnosed him with acute mountain sickness after the accident. Symptoms can feel like a hangover and include dizziness, headache, muscle aches and nausea.

"I felt my body get weak, and my car drifted out of the lane, but I was able to quickly correct it," he said in court. Five minutes later, Alkonis said, he began to talk with one of his children when he "lost his memory," and the crash ensued.The Japanese prosecution argued the following:The indictment alleged that Alkonis "dozed off" at the wheel.

He could have prevented the accident, a prosecutor argued in court, had he immediately stopped driving upon feeling drowsy.

"There was no emergency or necessity for him to continue driving," she said. "He carelessly continued to drive."In October 2021, the Shizuoka District Court convicted Alkonis of negligent driving resulting in death and injury. Alkonis lost his appeal in July 2022 and has been imprisoned since September 2022. Separate from his three-year prison term, the Alkonis family paid $1.65 million, "the largest private settlement by a U.S. service member in Japan's history", in extrajudicial restitution to the victims' families.

Aftermath
In December 2022, Navy Times reported on the status of Alkonis' pay and benefits:Family members of the 34-year-old sailor have lobbied the White House to seek early release for Alkonis. But Defense Department officials have said they respect the Japanese legal process, and last month said they would cut off pay and benefits for the service member and his family at the end of December.

Alkonis had relied on unused leave and other time off to avoid being cut off from his military salary sooner. When it ran out, military officials classified him as absent in violation of orders, and made the pay decision. After criticism from politicians such as Sen. Mike Lee (R-UT), Senate lawmakers added language in sec. 8145 of the FY23 federal budget omnibus bill to order the Navy to sustain Alkonis' "pay and allowances".

Senator Mike Lee's response 
Senator Mike Lee  of Utah has been a vocal critic of Japan’s handling of the conviction and imprisonment of Ridge Alkonis.  In February 2023, Lee issued a 24-hour deadline on Twitter to Japanese Prime Minister Fumio Kishida to hand over Alkonis and threatened to cut off military aid to Japan over the incident. After the deadline passed, Lee took to the floor of the U.S. Senate to question the Status of Forces Agreement between the U.S. and Japan, which governs how military personnel stationed in Japan will be treated under Japanese law.   The Japanese Foreign Ministry lodged an official complaint against Lee through the U.S. government in March 2023.

References

1988 births
United States Navy officers
21st-century American criminals
Latter Day Saints
Living people
Place of birth missing (living people)